Chhoti Khatu railway station is a railway station in Nagaur district, Rajasthan. Its code is CTKT. It serves Chhoti Khatu town. The station consists of a single platform. Passenger, Express, and Superfast trains halt here.

Trains

The following trains halt at Chhoti Khatu railway station in both directions:

 Bandra Terminus–Jammu Tawi Vivek Express
 Jodhpur–Delhi Sarai Rohilla Superfast Express
 Salasar Express
 Bhagat Ki Kothi–Kamakhya Express

References

Railway stations in Nagaur district
Jodhpur railway division